Croatia competed at the 2013 Mediterranean Games in Mersin, Turkey from 20 to 30 June 2013.

Medalists

Athletics 

Men
Field events

Women
Track & road events

Field events

Badminton 

Croatia will be represented by two badminton players.

Men

Bocce 

Croatia will be represented by two athletes.

Lyonnaise

Boxing 

Men

Cycling

Fencing 

Croatia will be represented by one fencer.

Men

Gymnastics

Artistic 

Men

Handball 

Croatia will be represented by the men's and women's handball teams. A total of 32 athletes.

Men's tournament
Team

Preliminary round

Women's tournament
Team

Preliminary round

Judo

Karate 

Men

Women

Rowing 

Women

Sailing 

Men

Women

Shooting 

Men

Women

Swimming 

Men

Women

Volleyball

Beach

Indoor

Women's tournament

Team

Samanta Fabris
Karla Klarić
Laura Miloš
Bernarda Ćutuk
Ivona Ćaćić
Bernarda Brčić
Mirta Bašelović
Iva Jurišić
Lucija Mlinar
Anamarija Miljak
Martina Malević
Katarina Pilepić

Standings

Results

Water polo 

Croatia will be represented by men's water polo team.

Men's tournament

Team 

Josip Pavić
Marko Bijač
Nikša Dobud
Ivan Krapić
Andro Bušlje
Ivan Milaković
Luka Lončar
Sandro Sukno
Petar Muslim
Luka Bukić
Maro Joković
Paulo Obradović
Anđelo Šetka

Standings

Results

Semifinals

Final

Water skiing 

Men

Wrestling 

Men's Greco-Roman

References

External links
https://web.archive.org/web/20130702035044/http://info.mersin2013.gov.tr/medals_country.aspx?n=CRO

Nations at the 2013 Mediterranean Games
2013
Mediterranean Games